This is a list of buildings and structures in the City and County of Swansea.

Buildings
BT Tower
Civic Centre
DVLA Computer Centre
Guildhall (Grade I listed)
Kilvey Hill TV transmitter
The Tower, Meridian Quay
Mumbles Lighthouse (Grade II listed)
Palace Theatre
Plantasia
Patti Pavilion
Sea View Community Primary School
Swansea Central Library (Grade II listed)
Swansea Central police station (Grade II listed)
Swansea Market
Swansea observatory
Tabernacle Chapel, Morriston (Grade I listed)
Vetch Field
Whiteford Lighthouse (Grade II listed)
Mumbles Pier

Structures
Landore viaduct (Grade II listed)
Loughor railway viaduct (Grade II listed)]
Swansea Bay barrage

Covered markets and shopping malls
Clydach Market
Picton Arcade
Shoppers Walk Arcade
Castle Arcade
High Street Arcade
Quadrant Shopping Centre
St. David's Shopping Centre
Swansea Market

Retail parks
Morfa Shopping Park
Pontarddulais Road Retail Park
Parc Fforestfach
Swansea Enterprise Park

Historical Buildings

Castles

Grade I Listed buildings

Church of St Cadoc, Cheriton
Guildhall
Oystermouth Castle, Oystermouth
Oxwich Castle, Oxwich
Penrice Castle, Penrice
Morriston Tabernacle, Morriston
Swansea Castle
Weobley Castle, Llanrhidian

See also
List of places in Swansea (categorised)
List of cultural venues in Swansea
List of public art in Swansea

Swansea-related lists